Marat Mikhailovich Minibayev (born 15 August 1966) is a former Russian professional footballer.

Club career
He made his professional debut in the Soviet Second League in 1983 for FC Lokomotiv Chelyabinsk.

References

1966 births
Living people
Soviet footballers
Russian footballers
Association football defenders
FC SKA Rostov-on-Don players
FC Halychyna Drohobych players
FC APK Morozovsk players
FC Dynamo Stavropol players
FC Rostov players
FC Arsenal Tula players
Soviet Top League players
Russian Premier League players